CMLL Super Viernes was professional wrestling promotion Consejo Mundial de Lucha Libre's (CMLL) Friday night wrestling show that takes place in Arena México every Friday night unless a Pay-Per-View or a major wrestling event is scheduled to take place on that night. CMLL began holding their weekly Friday night "Super Viernes" shows as far back as 1938 and continued the tradition through 2014 as well. Some of the matches from Super Viernes were taped for CMLL's weekly shows that air in Mexico and the United States on various channels in the weeks following the Super Viernes show. CMLL presented a total of 48 Super Viernes shows. The only Fridays in 2014 to not feature a Super Viernes show was when CMLL held one of their signature events instead, which in 2014 was their annual Homenaje a Dos Leyendas, Juicio Final, CMLL 81st Anniversary Show and Infierno en el Ring. Super Viernes also hosted most of the major CMLL annual tournaments, which in 2014 included the finals of the 2013 Leyenda de Plata, Torneo Gran Alternativa, Torneo De Parejas Increibles, En Busca de un Ídolo, Leyenda de Azul, the Universal Championship and La Copa Junior VIP. The show also features a number of high profile championship matches, which so far in 2014 has included 4 championship matches, the CMLL World Trios Championship and the CMLL World Tag Team Championship changed hands and the CMLL World Tag Team Championship and CMLL World Middleweight Championship were successfully defended on the shows.

The Super Viernes events featured a number of professional wrestling matches, in which some wrestlers were involved in pre-existing scripted feuds or storylines and others were teamed up with no backstory reason as such. Wrestlers themselves portrayed either "Rudos" or fan favorites ("Tecnicos" in Mexico) as they competed in matches with pre-determined outcomes. 2014 the 41 Super Viernes shows so far will have featured 337 matches in total, 290 for the male division, 30 featuring the female division and 17 featuring the Mini-Estrellas. 131 different wrestlers appeared in matches during CMLL's Super Viernes shows. Of those 132 wrestlers 16 were Mini-Estrellas and 18 were women. Último Guerrero wrestled on 40 shows in total, the most of any individual wrestler, which meant he appeared on 83% of all the shows. Marcela was the woman most often featured on Super Viernes with 22 matches, appearing in 74% of the women's matches booked for Super Viernes. Pequeño Olímpico and Último Dragoncito were the Mini-Estrella who had the most appearances, wrestling 8 times in total each, or in 47% of all Mini-Estrella matches. Apocalipsis, Camaleón, Metálico, Inquisidor, Olímpico, Pequeño Universo 2000, Syuri and Zayco all wrestled only on one Super Viernes in 2014.

Super Viernes shows of 2014

Footnotes

References

2014 in professional wrestling
Professional wrestling-related lists
2014